The Bhutan men's national cricket team, nicknamed The Dragons, represents the Kingdom of Bhutan in international cricket. The team is organised by the Bhutan Cricket Council Board, which became an affiliate member of the International Cricket Council (ICC) in 2001 and an associate member in 2017. Bhutan made its international debut in 2003, at the Emerging Nations Tournament organised by the Asian Cricket Council (ACC). The team has since regularly participated in ACC tournaments, and also in two World Cricket League events, WCL Division Eight in 2010 and 2012.

The Dechephu Lhakhang (temple) in Thimphu is the spiritual home of Bhutan Cricket and players visit before every tournament. “We do not pray for victory”, said national captain Damber Singh Gurung, “we pray for each other to give our best and to emerge complete from the competition.”

History
Bhutan Cricket Council Board became an affiliate member of the ICC in 2001. They played their first internationals in 2003 in a tri-nation series against Maldives and Nepal, hosted by the latter. They made their ACC Trophy debut at the 2004 tournament, where they made the quarter finals. Their first international victory came against Iran.

They again competed at the ACC Trophy in 2006 but were eliminated in the first round after a series of heavy defeats. Their only win came against newcomers Myanmar.

Following the 2006 ACC Trophy, the tournament was split into two divisions: Elite and Challenge. Bhutan took part in the 2009 ACC Trophy Challenge, where they were runners up. This result qualified them for the next ACC Trophy Elite as well as Division Eight of the World Cricket League.

2018-Present
In April 2018, the ICC decided to grant full Twenty20 International (T20I) status to all its members. Therefore, all Twenty20 matches played between Bhutan and other ICC members after 1 January 2019 will be a full T20I. 

Bhutan played their first T20I on 5 December 2019, against Nepal, during the 2019 South Asian Games.

Tournament history

ACC Eastern Region T20
 2018: Winners
 2020: Did not participate

World Cricket League

 2010 Division Eight: 7th place – relegated
 2012 Division Eight: 8th place – relegated

ACC Trophy

 2004: Quarter finals
 2006: 13th place
 2010 Elite: 8th place

ACC Trophy Challenge

 2009: 2nd place

ACC Twenty20 Cup

 2011: 9th place

Records and Statistics 

International Match Summary — Bhutan
 
Last updated 11 July 2022

Twenty20 International 
 Highest team total: 135/6 v. Thailand on 9 July 2022 at UKM-YSD Cricket Oval, Bangi.
 Highest individual score: 51, Thinley Jamtsho v. Thailand on 9 July 2022 at UKM-YSD Cricket Oval, Bangi.
 Best individual bowling figures: 4/13, Ngawang Thinley v. Thailand on 6 July 2022 at UKM-YSD Cricket Oval, Bangi.

T20I record versus other nations

Records complete to T20I #1632. Last updated 11 July 2022.

Other records
For a list of selected international matches played by Bhutan, see Cricket Archive.

See also 
 List of Bhutan Twenty20 International cricketers
 Bhutan women's national cricket team

References

External links
 Bhutan Cricket official site

Cricket in Bhutan
National cricket teams
Cricket
Bhutan in international cricket